The Chinese Elm cultivar Ulmus parvifolia 'Nire-keyaki' is a dwarf variety principally used for bonsai.

Description
The clone is distinguished by its dense branching and fringed leaves.

Pests and diseases
The species and its cultivars are highly resistant, but not immune, to Dutch elm disease, and unaffected by the elm leaf beetle Xanthogaleruca luteola.

Cultivation
Known in Europe and Australasia, 'Nire-keyaki' does not appear to have been introduced to North America

Synonymy
Zelkova 'Nire', Ulmus 'Nire', Ulmus 'Nire-keyaki'.

Accessions
None known.

Nurseries

Europe

Kwekerij Rein & Mark Bulk , Boskoop, Netherlands.

Australasia

Yamina Rare Plants , Monbulk, Melbourne, Australia. (Listed erroneously as U. davidiana 'Nire-keyaki').

References

Chinese elm cultivar
Ulmus articles missing images
Ulmus